Karpan may refer to:

 Karpan, Iran, village in Hormozgan Province, Iran
 Karpan (character), character in the comic album series Yoko Tsuno
 Martín Karpan (born 1974), Argentine actor
 Vaughn Karpan (born 1961), Canadian former ice hockey player